China Southern Airlines Flight 3943 was a China Southern Airlines flight from the former Guangzhou Baiyun International Airport, Guangzhou to Guilin Qifengling Airport, Guilin, China on 24 November 1992. It crashed on descent to Guilin Airport, killing all 141 people aboard.

Aircraft
The aircraft involved in the accident was a Boeing 737-3Y0, registration B-2523, that was equipped with a twin CFMI CFM56-3B-1 powerplant. With serial number 24913, it had its maiden flight on 10 May 1991 and was delivered new to China Southern Airlines on 23 May the same year. The airframe was  old at the time of the accident, and had logged 4,165 flight hours and 3,153 cycles.

Accident
Flight 3943 departed Guangzhou on a 55-minute flight to Guilin. The plane's autothrottle was engaged for descent, but the crew did not notice that the number 2 power lever was at idle. This led to an asymmetrical power condition. The airplane rolled to the right, and the crew was unable to regain control. At 07:52, the plane crashed into a mountain in the sparsely populated Guangxi region. It is also the accident with the highest number of fatalities involving a China Southern Airlines aircraft.

Nationalities 
There were 141 people on board, of whom 131 were passengers. Occupants of the aircraft were from the following countries or regions:

Similar accidents

 Sriwijaya Air Flight 182
 TAROM Flight 371 
United Airlines Flight 585 
USAir Flight 427

References

External links
 Accident information at airfleets.net

Aviation accidents and incidents in 1992
Aviation accidents and incidents in China
Airliner accidents and incidents caused by pilot error
Accidents and incidents involving the Boeing 737 Classic
3943
1992 disasters in China
History of Guangxi
November 1992 events in Asia